Elvis Sinosic (born 13 February 1971) is a retired Australian professional mixed martial artist who competed in the Ultimate Fighting Championship (UFC). Sinosic also competed in the Cage Rage Championships, K-1, and Pancrase.

Biography
Sinosic was born in Canberra, Australian Capital Territory, to Croatian immigrant parents, and now resides in Sydney, New South Wales. He currently owns and runs Kings Academy of Martial Arts (fromerly Sinosic Perosh Martial Arts SPMA) as well as UFC Gym Macarthur Square.  Elvis ran SPMA with business and training partner Anthony Perosh for 16 years before Elvis and Anthony split the Academy. Sinosic was exposed to a myriad of art forms including: Wrestling, Tae Kwon Do, Boxing, Jeet Kune Do, Kali, Silat, Muay Thai, Capoeira, Kickboxing, Judo, Shootfighting, Jiu-Jitsu. Elvis was also the first BJJ Pan-Pacific Absolute Champion at the Inaugural event 1999. 

Elvis worked on the Fox Sports Australia Fight Week.

Elvis has been running Kings Academy

Mixed martial arts career 
Considered to be a pioneer of Australian mixed martial arts, Sinosic fought on the first ever Australian MMA show, Caged Combat. Mr Sinosic competed for and won the first ever Australian MMA title, the Australian Vale Tudo Heavyweight Championship. He was also the first Australian to fight for a nominal World Title (Universal Combat Challenge 1 vs Dave Beneteau), and was the first Australian to fight in an MMA match in K-1 when he lost at the K-1 World Grand Prix 2000 vs Frank Shamrock. Mr Sinosic was also the first Australian to fight in the UFC – UFC 30 vs Jeremy Horn – his only winning performance with the organization, where he was the first Australian to fight for a UFC World Championship (UFC 32 in a loss vs. Tito Ortiz).

UFC career
Sinosic's last fight in the UFC was a loss to Michael Bisping due to TKO (strikes) at UFC 70.
 He was scheduled to return to the octagon in 2010 for a rematch against Chris Haseman at UFC 110, the first UFC event to be held in Australia. However, just days before the fight, Sinosic was forced to withdraw with a shoulder injury.

Post UFC
Sinosic's last fight was a KO loss to Paul Cahoon at Cage Rage 24 on 1 December 2007.

Political career 
In 2022, Sinosic was an "endorsed" candidate for the United Australia Party.

The United Australia welcomed Mr Sinosic with open arms when the 2022 Australian Federal Election commenced. Multiple news sources had reported that the United Australia / Clive Palmer's party will run candidates in every electorate at the federal election, and the list of hopefuls is full of anti-vaccination and anti-lockdown campaigners. Three out of every four video ads the United Australia party has posted on YouTube since late September have been pulled by Google for allegedly violating advertising policies, according to Google’s transparency report.

Sinosic has made public comments with regards to the misinformation that has come from the United Australia party, such as "we all make mistakes". It has recently been demonstrated that much of the "misinformation" that the candidates and party were branded with has turned out to be correct. 

On 23 August 2021 The Daily Telegraph reported an article to confirm that Elvis had been arrested & charged for breaching public health restrictions in Sydney, NSW.

2022 Federal Election results

Professional wrestling career
All-Star Wrestling Australia hosted the professional wrestling debut of former UFC fighter Elvis Sinosic.

Other media
Sinosic's knockout loss to Forrest Griffin appeared in the 2007 film Next starring Nicolas Cage and Jessica Biel. Elvis was also cast member and appeared in the movie "Gods of Egypt".

He appeared at All-Star Wrestling Australia to make his professional wrestling debut.

Championships and accomplishments 
Ultimate Fighting Championship
Fight of the Night (One time) vs. Michael Bisping

Mixed martial arts record

|-
| Loss
| align=center| 7–11–2
| Paul Cahoon
| TKO (punches)
| Cage Rage 24
| 
| align=center| 1
| align=center| 0:21
| London, England
| 
|-
| Loss
| align=center| 7–10–2
| Michael Bisping
| TKO (punches)
| UFC 70
| 
| align=center| 2
| align=center| 1:40
| Manchester, England
| 
|-
| Win
| align=center| 7–9–2
| Mark Epstein
| Submission (armbar)
| Cage Rage 19
| 
| align=center| 1
| align=center| 2:37
| London, England
| 
|-
| Win
| align=center| 6–9–2
| Shamoji Fuji
| Submission (armbar)
| Xplosion
| 
| align=center| 1
| align=center| 2:40
| Sydney, New South Wales, Australia
| 
|-
| Loss
| align=center| 5–9–2
| Alessio Sakara
| Decision (unanimous)
| UFC 57: Liddell vs. Couture 3
| 
| align=center| 3
| align=center| 5:00
| Las Vegas, Nevada, United States
| 
|-
| Loss
| align=center| 5–8–2
| Forrest Griffin
| TKO (punches)
| UFC 55: Fury
| 
| align=center| 1
| align=center| 3:22
| Uncasville, Connecticut, United States
| 
|-
| Draw
| align=center| 5–7–2
| Daijiro Matsui
| Draw
| Pancrase: Spiral 5
| 
| align=center| 2
| align=center| 5:00
| Yokohama, Japan
| 
|-
| Win
| align=center| 5–7–1
| Roberto Traven
| KO (punch)
| WR 1 – Warriors Realm 1
| 
| align=center| 2
| 
| Sunshine Coast, Queensland, Australia
| 
|-
| Loss
| align=center| 4–7–1
| Sanae Kikuta
| Decision (unanimous)
| Pancrase - 10th Anniversary Show
| 
| align=center| 3
| align=center| 5:00
| Tokyo, Japan
| 
|-
| Loss
| align=center| 4–6–1
| Renato Sobral
| Decision (unanimous)
| UFC 38
| 
| align=center| 3
| align=center| 5:00
| London, England
| 
|-
| Loss
| align=center| 4–5–1
| Evan Tanner
| TKO (doctor stoppage)
| UFC 36
| 
| align=center| 1
| align=center| 2:06
| Las Vegas, Nevada, United States
| 
|-
| Loss
| align=center| 4–4–1
| Tito Ortiz
| TKO (punches and elbows)
| UFC 32
| 
| align=center| 1
| align=center| 3:32
| East Rutherford, New Jersey, United States
| 
|-
| Win
| align=center| 4–3–1
| Jeremy Horn
| Submission (triangle armbar)
| UFC 30
| 
| align=center| 1
| align=center| 2:59
| Atlantic City, New Jersey, United States
| 
|-
| Loss
| align=center| 3–3–1
| Frank Shamrock
| Decision
| K-1 Grand Prix 2000 Final
| 
| align=center| 5
| align=center| 3:00
| Tokyo, Japan
| 
|-
| Draw
| align=center| 3–2–1
| Dave Beneteau
| Draw
| UCC 1 – The New Beginning
| 
| align=center| 2
| align=center| 10:00
| Montreal, Quebec, Canada
| 
|-
| Loss
| align=center| 3–2
| Al Reynish
| TKO (retirement)
| Rings Australia: NR2
| 
| align=center| 1
| align=center| 7:52
| Australia
| 
|-
| Win
| align=center| 3–1
| Daniel Bond
| TKO
| AVT – Australia Vale Tudo
| 
| align=center| 1
| 
| Australia
| 
|-
| Win
| align=center| 2–1
| Kevin McConachie
| TKO
| AVT – Australia Vale Tudo
| 
| align=center| 1
| 
| Australia
| 
|-
| Loss
| align=center| 1–1
| Chris Haseman
| Submission (chin to the eye)
| Caged Combat 1 – Australian Ultimate Fighting
| 
| align=center| 1
| align=center| 2:47
| Sydney, New South Wales, Australia
| 
|-
| Win
| align=center| 1–0
| Matt Rocca
| TKO (punches)
| Caged Combat 1 – Australian Ultimate Fighting
| 
| align=center| 1
| align=center| 0:41
| Sydney, New South Wales, Australia
|

References

External links 
 
 
 

Australian male mixed martial artists
Light heavyweight mixed martial artists
Mixed martial artists utilizing boxing
Mixed martial artists utilizing taekwondo
Mixed martial artists utilizing capoeira
Mixed martial artists utilizing Jeet Kune Do
Mixed martial artists utilizing Muay Thai
Mixed martial artists utilizing pankration
Mixed martial artists utilizing silat
Mixed martial artists utilizing shootfighting
Mixed martial artists utilizing freestyle wrestling
Mixed martial artists utilizing judo
Mixed martial artists utilizing jujutsu
Mixed martial artists utilizing Brazilian jiu-jitsu
Ultimate Fighting Championship male fighters
1971 births
Living people
Australian practitioners of Brazilian jiu-jitsu
People awarded a black belt in Brazilian jiu-jitsu
Australian male taekwondo practitioners
Australian capoeira practitioners
Australian jujutsuka
Australian Muay Thai practitioners
Australian male sport wrestlers
Australian submission wrestlers
Australian people of Croatian descent
Sportspeople from Canberra
Australian male professional wrestlers